The Doctor of Physiotherapy is an extended master's degree under the Australian Qualifications Framework Level 9 classification. The Doctor of Physiotherapy program at this time is only offered in Australia. The degree should not be confused with the American Doctor of Physical therapy, which is a post baccalaureate degree.

Academic degrees of Australia
Academic degrees in healthcare